Paul Hampton (born August 20, 1937) is an American actor, singer, lyricist and writer.

Career
While he was a sophomore at Dartmouth College, he was signed to Columbia Records and Columbia Pictures at the same time to write music with Hal David and Burt Bacharach. In 1960, with Bacharach he co-composed and performed the strange death disc "Two Hour Honeymoon" (Dot Records). After this initial outing he co-wrote hits for Don Gibson ("Sea of Heartbreak"), Gene Pitney ("Donna Means Heartbreak"), Johnny Tillotson ("I Rise, I Fall") and hits for overseas artists ("Angry at the Old Oak Tree.") Also he wrote the theme for "My Mother the Car" and sang it under the group name Albuquerque. He made two albums, "Beautiful Beginnings" and "Rest Home For Children."

Some of his songs have been recorded by Sammy Davis Jr., Bette Midler, Eddy Arnold, Tom Jones, Merle Haggard, Ricky Nelson, Elvis Presley, Gene Pitney and Johnny Cash.

His film career began in 1958 starring in Senior Prom. Many television appearances ensued such as The New Phil Silvers Show, The Doris Day Show, The Smothers Brothers Comedy Hour, McCloud, Ironside, Combat!, Benson and others. Some notable movie appearances were in Lady Sings the Blues, Shivers, Hit!, More Dead Than Alive, as a trigger-happy punk," and the award-winning television show Never Forget. Hampton continues to act and compose today (2010).

In 2008 Tony Award-winning actress and singer Idina Menzel recorded Hampton's song "Hope" for the Major League Baseball Stand Up To Cancer 
charitable program.

He is the ASCAP award-winning songwriter for "Sea of Heartbreak", used in the soundtrack for the films The Butcher Boy, A Perfect World, Heartbreak Ridge and Clay Pigeons.
In 2010 singer Rosanne Cash covered the song in a duo with Bruce Springsteen which received a Grammy nomination and was promoted as the
single from her album The List.

Selected filmography
 1958 Senior Prom as Tom Harper
 1966 Women of the Prehistoric Planet as Wilson
 1968 More Dead Than Alive as Billy
 1970 Black Water Gold as Roger
 1970 WUSA as Rusty Fargo
 1971 Private Duty Nurses as Dewey
 1972 Lady Sings the Blues as Harry
 1973 Hit! as Barry Strong
 1975 Shivers as Roger St. Luc
 1982 Butterfly as Norton
 1987 Winners Take All as Frank Bushing
 1992 Waxwork II: Lost in Time as Prosecution
 1993 The Thing Called Love as Doug Siskin
 1993 Babylon 5: The Gathering as The Senator
 1995 The Stranger as Buck

Music
1957: Play it Cool b/w Classy Babe1957: Rockin' Doll b/w Please Love Me1957: Slam Bam Thank You Ma'am b/w Live A Life of Love1958: Love b/w The Longer I Love You1959: Write Me b/w Don't Unless You Love Me1960: Two Hour Honeymoon b/w Creams1963: I'm In Love With A Bunny* (At The Playboy* Club) b/w Bandera1965: My Mother the Car – composer: theme music. Song performed by Hampton under the name Albuquerque.
1970:  ALBUM – Beautiful Beginnings, Barnaby Records
1974:  ALBUM – Rest Home For Children'', Crested Butte Records

References

External links
 

1937 births
American male composers
21st-century American composers
American male film actors
Songwriters from Oklahoma
American male television actors
Dartmouth College alumni
Living people
Musicians from Oklahoma City
Male actors from Oklahoma City
21st-century American male musicians
American male songwriters